Echinopsis pachanoi (syn. It is found in Argentina, Bolivia, Colombia, Chile, Ecuador, Peru and Venezuela , and it is cultivated in other parts of the world. Uses for it include traditional medicine and traditional veterinary medicine, and it is widely grown as an ornamental cactus. It has been used for healing and religious divination in the Andes Mountains region for over 3,000 years. It is sometimes confused with its close relative Echinopsis peruviana (Peruvian torch cactus).

Taxonomy
Echinopsis pachanoi is known by many names throughout South America such as achuma, huachuma, wachuma, aguacolla, hahuacollay, San Pedro or giganton.

Description
Echinopsis pachanoi is native to Ecuador and Peru. White flowers are produced at the end of the stems; they open at night and last for about two days. Large numbers can be produced by well established cacti and may open new flowers over a period of weeks. There are black hairs along the length of the thick base leading to the flower.

Traditional uses

Echinopsis pachanoi has a long history of being used in Andean traditional medicine. Archaeological studies have found evidence of use going back two thousand years, to Moche culture, Nazca culture, and Chavín culture. Although Roman Catholic church authorities after the Spanish conquest attempted to suppress its use, this failed, as shown by the Christian element in the common name "San Pedro cactus" – Saint Peter cactus. The name is attributed to the belief that just as St Peter holds the keys to heaven, the effects of the cactus allow users "to reach heaven while still on earth." In 2022, the Peruvian Ministry of Culture declared the traditional use of San Pedro cactus in northern Peru as cultural heritage.

Alkaloids

The San Pedro cactus contains a number of alkaloids, including the well-studied chemical mescaline (from 0.053% up to 4.7% of dry cactus weight), and also 3,4-dimethoxyphenethylamine, 3-Methoxytyramine, 4-hydroxy-3-methoxyphenethylamine, 4-hydroxy-3,5-dimethoxyphenethylamine, anhalonidine, anhalinine, hordenine, and tyramine.

Mescaline is a psychedelic drug and entheogen, which is also found in some other species of genus Echinopsis (i.e. Echinopsis lageniformis, Echinopsis peruviana, and Echinopsis scopulicola) and the species Lophophora williamsii (peyote). Mescaline induces a psychedelic state comparable to those produced by LSD and psilocybin, but with unique characteristics.

Anecdotal evidence suggests that the highest concentration of active substances is found in the layer of green photosynthetic tissue just beneath the skin.

Cultivation

The San Pedro cactus grows in USDA hardiness zones 8b to 10. The range of minimum temperatures in which San Pedro is known to grow is between -9.4 °C and 10 °C.

The San Pedro cactus is very easy to grow in most areas and grows best in a temperate climate. Because it grows naturally in the Peruvian Andes Mountains at high altitude and with high rainfall, it can withstand temperatures far below that of many other cacti. It requires fertile, free-draining soil. They grow up to 30 cm per year. They are susceptible to fungal diseases if over-watered, but are not nearly as sensitive as many other cacti, especially in warm weather. They can be sunburned and display a yellowing chlorotic reaction to overexposure to sunlight.

In winter, plants will etiolate, or become thin, due to lower levels of light. This may be problematic if the etiolated zone is not sufficiently strong to support future growth as the cactus may break in strong winds.

Propagation from cuttings
Like many other plants, Echinopsis pachanoi can be propagated from cuttings. The result is a genetic clone of the parent plant. A long cactus column can be also laid on its side on the ground (like a log), and eventually roots will sprout from it and grow into the ground. After time, sprouts will form and cactus columns will grow upward out of it along its length.

From seed
Like a lot of its relatives, Trichocereus pachanoi as a species is easily grown from seed, often by means of a so-called "Takeaway Tek". This term refers to the practice of the sowing of Trichocereus (and sometimes other types of cactus) seed into plastic containers, such as those many food takeaways are delivered in. This creates a semi-controlled humidity environment chamber for six months to a year, in which the seed may germinate and then grow relatively unbothered by environmental contamination.

Legality

In most countries, it is legal to cultivate the San Pedro cactus. In countries where possession of mescaline and related compounds is illegal and highly penalized, cultivation for the purposes of consumption is most likely illegal and also highly penalized. This is the case in the United States, Australia, Canada, Sweden, Germany, and New Zealand, where it is currently legal to cultivate the San Pedro cactus for gardening and ornamental purposes, but not for consumption.

Gallery

See also
 Ayahuasca
 Cimora
 List of psychoactive plants
 Psychedelic microdosing
 Stela of the cactus bearer

References

Further reading 

 Jay, Mike (2019). Mescaline: A Global History of the First Psychedelic. Yale University Press.
 Pollan, Michael (2021). This Is Your Mind on Plants. Penguin Press.

 Sharon, Douglas (2000). Shamanism & the Sacred Cactus: Ethnoarchaeological Evidence for San Pedro Use in Northern Peru. San Diego Museum of Man.

External links

 San Pedro: Basic Info – International Center for Ethnobotanical Education, Research, and Service (ICEERS)
 Psychoactive Cacti vault – Erowid

pachanoi
Cacti of South America
Entheogens
Flora of Argentina
Flora of Bolivia
Flora of Chile
Flora of Ecuador
Flora of Peru
Flora of the Andes
Herbal and fungal hallucinogens
Medicinal plants of South America
Night-blooming plants
Psychoactive cacti
Psychedelic phenethylamine carriers